453rd may refer to:

453d Electronic Warfare Squadron, United States Air Force unit
453d Operations Group, inactive United States Air Force unit

See also
453 (number)
453, the year 453 (CDLIII) of the Julian calendar
453 BC